Opobo is a  community in Rivers State, in the South South region of Nigeria. The kingdom was founded in 1870 by Jubo Jubogha, popularly known as JaJa, an Igbo man who was an apprentice under Annie Pepple house in Bonny, grew to become a Chief and eventually wanted to be King in Bonny. He was followed and supported by Chiefs from 14 major houses that left Bonny to establish Opobo. The native language of Opobo is the Ibani language that is spoken in Bonny also, although I’m recent years their Igbo-creole known as Ubani as taken became the primary tongue 

A greater part of the city state is still referred to as Opobo in Rivers State. Opobo is made up of several islands and communities which is in Opobo–Nkoro Local Government Area in the South South Senatorial District of Rivers State Nigeria.

The communities include Opobo Town, which is its headquarters, Queenstown, Kalasunju, Oloma, Ayaminimah, Iloma, Minimah, Okpukpo, Iwoma, Ekereborokiri, Kalaibiama, Epelema, Ozuobulu, Muma Down Below, Inokiri and Abazibie.
Opobo's geologic setting is similar to the coastal and estuarine settlements of the Niger Delta region. It is located at the mouth of the Imo River, one of the main estuaries that break the Nigerian coastline. Opobo is two meters above sea level and the very close interfaces between the sea water.

Opobo is divided into 14 sections ("polo"), made up of Sixty Seven War Canoe Houses. The Fourteen sections are Adibie, Biriye, Diepiri, Dapu, Dappa Ye Amakiri, Epelle and Fubarakworo. Others are Iroanya, Jaja, Kalaomuso, Ukonu, Kiepirima, Owujie and Tolofari.

History

Opobo is located to the east of the Kingdom of Bonny. Bonny and Opobo are of the same origin, both associated with the Ndoki people. an Igbo subgroup. Jubo Jubogha rose from slavery to lead the Anna Pepple chieftaincy house of Bonny  In 1870, Jubo first arrived in what is now Opobo, having moved there due to a civil war in Bonny between his followers and those of Chief Oko Jumbo, the leader of the rival  Manilla Pepple chieftaincy family. The king named his new state after Amanyanabo Opubo "Pepple" Perekule the Great, a Pepple king in Bonny that had reigned there from 1792 to 1830.

Jubo Jubogha became involved in palm oil trading with Europeans.  He started a trading post at Opobo Town, close to Ikot Abasi and 4 miles southwest of the Opobo river. Due to his dealings with them, he soon acquired the trade name Jaja. Jubo Jubogha was never on good terms with the Annang and the Ibibio in the east, as he declared himself as the middleman in palm oil trading, thus asking them to stop trading directly with the Europeans. This resulted in a war (the Ikot Udo Obong War) between Jubo and the Annang and Ibuno people as recorded by Nair. In 1887, he was deceived when he was told to go and negotiate with the Queen of the United Kingdom by the British. He was captured upon his arrival on the consul's flagship, and was sent into exile in Saint Vincent in the West Indies thereafter.

Traditions
The following are a few of Opobo's unique customs:

 Dogs are forbidden. This tradition, which has its roots in ancient times, is one of the most important taboos the people of this coastal town hold on to. While the people are free to bring in dog meat to eat in their homes whenever they feel like it, they are not allowed to keep dogs as pets or bring them into the community.
 Shooting a gun is not allowed. Such a thing is only to occur by royal sanction during a war.
 Individuals are forbidden from wearing caps while passing through the gateway linking one compound to another. The gateways are small roofed passages, essentially a series of tunnels, connecting one compound to another. On the floor of such gateways is a crossbar, which those passing are forbidden to set foot on. Adhering to this rule while passing through the place is a mark of respect for the high chief of a particular compound, which is also referred to as a war canoe house.
 Making noise, pounding or quarrelling at night is forbidden. Making any form of noise at night is one of the biggest offences anyone can commit in this island community. You could be labelled an enemy of the town. Similarly, quarrelling and fighting at night is taboo here as well. Regardless of how provoked you are, you must wait till the break of dawn to vent your anger on whoever has provoked you.

Breaking any of these rules attracts a fine each or a serious punishment by the compound heads.

Initiation into womanhood
A certified wife who has not been initiated into womanhood with the appropriate initiation ceremony, known as the Egerebite and Bibite, is not allowed to tie a special wrapper called 'George'. Such a woman would also be denied many other rights: there are sacred places that she cannot enter and she will not be entitled to mix freely with women that have been initiated. In fact, she can be traditionally disgraced by the other women in the community at any time.

Rulers
The rulers of Opobo were:

Notable people
Kenneth Minimah, CFR, a Nigerian infantry soldier and the former Nigerian Army Chief of Army Staff
Atedo Peterside, CON, a Nigerian entrepreneur, investment banker and economist.
Dakuku Peterside, former Director-General of Nigerian Maritime Administration and Safety Agency, NIMASA. 
Adawari Pepple, businessman, and former senator.
 Amaopusenibo Sim Fubara   Rivers State 2023 PDP Governorship candidate

Gallery

Notes

References

Further reading
 Burns, Alan. History of Nigeria, George Allen & Unwin, 1929.
 Dike, Kenneth O. Trade and Politics in the Niger Delta, 1830-1885, Oxford University Press, 1956.
 Annang Heritage Preservation, article on Annang
 Britannica article on Ikot Abasi
 Nair, Kannan K. (1972). Politics and Society in South Eastern Nigeria 1841-1906, Frank Cass, London.

External links

Populated places in Rivers State
City-states
1870 establishments in Africa